Marin Karamarko (born 14 April 1998) is a Croatian football defender who plays for Austrian Bundesliga side TSV Hartberg.

References

External links
 

1998 births
Living people
Sportspeople from Pula
Association football central defenders
Croatian footballers
RNK Split players
NK GOŠK Gabela players
NŠ Mura players
TSV Hartberg players
Premier League of Bosnia and Herzegovina players
Slovenian PrvaLiga players
Croatian expatriate footballers
Expatriate footballers in Bosnia and Herzegovina
Croatian expatriate sportspeople in Bosnia and Herzegovina
Expatriate footballers in Slovenia
Croatian expatriate sportspeople in Slovenia
Expatriate footballers in Austria
Croatian expatriate sportspeople in Austria